The Women's 4x100m Medley Relay at the 2006 Central American and Caribbean Games occurred on July 21, 2006 at the S.U. Pedro de Heredia Aquatic Complex in Cartagena, Colombia.

Only 6 relays were entered in the event, and consequently, it was only swum once (in finals).

Records at the time of the event were:
World Record: 3:57.32,  Australia (Rooney, Jones, Thomas, Henry), Athens, Greece, August 21, 2004.
Games Record: 4:23.42,  Mexico (Marmolejo, Maristany, España, Lopez), 2002 Games in San Salvador (Nov.28.2002).

Results

References

2006 CAC results: Women's 4x100 Medley Relay from the website of the 2006 Central American and Caribbean Games; retrieved 2009-07-13.

Medley Relay, Women's 4x100m
2006 in women's swimming